Issa Alekasir Rajabi (born 7 February 1990) is an Iranian footballer who plays as a striker for Persepolis in the Persian Gulf Pro League.

Club career
Alekasir joined Paykan after promoting with Esteghlal Ahvaz to Azadegan League in summer 2012. He spent a poor season with Paykan where he played 12 times without scoring a goal. In summer 2013 he joined to Albadr Bandar Kong. After Albadr Bandar Kong's relegation to Iran Football's 2nd Division in 2014, he joined Aluminium Hormozgan. After shining with his new club, he had offers from Foolad and Naft Tehran in mid-season, he tagged a Rls.3 billion (about US$80,000) fee which declined by both Pro League sides. He finished season with 11 goals and named as Best goal scorer of 2014–15 Azadegan League.

Naft Tehran
On 28 June 2015, he joined Naft Tehran with a three-years contract as a free agent.

Return to Paykan
In June 2018, he rejoined Paykan, where he played for one season.

Sanat Naft Abadan
Alekasir scored 12 goals in the 2019–20 season with Sanat Naft Abadan.

Persepolis
On 1 September 2020, Alekasir signed a two-year contract with Persian Gulf Pro League champions Persepolis. On 24 September, he scored his first goal for Persepolis in a 4–0 win over Sharjah in the 2020 AFC Champions League group stage. On 27 September, he scored the winning goal in a 1–0 win over Al Sadd in the Champions League round of 16. On 30 September, he scored two goals in a 2–0 win against Pakhtakor in the Champions League quarter-finals. Afterwards, the AFC suspended Alekasir for 6 months because his goal celebration in the game was ruled to be a "discriminatory gesture".

Club career statistics

Honours

Club

Esteghlal Ahvaz
League 2 (1): 2011–12

Naft Tehran
Hazfi Cup (1): 2016–17

Persepolis
Persian Gulf Pro League (1): 2020–21
Iranian Super Cup (1): 2020
AFC Champions League runner-up (1): 2020

Individual
Azadegan League Top scorer: 2014–15 (11 goals) 
Hazfi Cup Top scorer: 2015–16 (4 goals)

References

External links

Issa Alekasir at PersianLeague

1990 births
Living people
Iranian footballers
Association football forwards
Persian Gulf Pro League players
Esteghlal Ahvaz players
Naft Tehran F.C. players
Sanat Naft Abadan F.C. players
Persepolis F.C. players
Sportspeople from Khuzestan province